Guilty Until Proven Insane is the fourth studio album released by Skyhooks on 13 March 1978. It was the first album to feature Bob Spencer, who replaced guitarist Red Symons in early 1977. Spencer had played in Sydney rock band Finch and would later become a member of The Angels.

Details
The album's name comes from a line in the song "Twisted Innocence", which states 'if I'm guilty until proven insane...' The first 5000 copies of the album were available in red vinyl. it is the first of Skyhooks' albums to include an uncensored version of "Why Dontcha All Get Fucked" recorded in a studio, as opposed to live and censored versions. It is also the last album vocalist Graeme "Shirley" Strachan made with Skyhooks before the recording sessions which would be released as The Lost Album.

In April 1979, 350 copies of the album were seized by Victorian vice squad detectives. Senior Constable John Challis said, "The record in question was by the Skyhooks called "Guilty Until Proven Insane" and one song was suspected of being obscene."

Two singles were released from the album. "Women in Uniform" was a Top 10 hit nationwide, while "Megalomania" peaked at number 93. The sixth track in the album, "Hotel Hell", was used on the FOX reality series Hotel Hell starring Gordon Ramsay.

Reception

Donald Robertson, writing in Roadrunner, expressed disappointment with the album: "I'm afraid to say it's a really patchy affair. Apart from the cracking "Women in Uniform" the album lacks the sparkle and wit of the stage act and the previous albums. I only hope Greg Macainsh goes back to writing songs about Australia. No one does it better."

Rip It Up magazine's Jeremy Templer wrote that: "Like the Rolling Stones, Skyhooks still feel something of an obligation to be outrageous but they remain as strikingly original as when they first began."

Track listing

Personnel
Graeme "Shirley" Strachan – lead vocals
Bob Spencer – guitar, backing vocals
Bob "Bongo" Starkie – guitar
Greg Macainsh – bass guitar, narration
Imants "Freddy" Strauks – drums, percussion, backing vocals

Additional personnel
Joe Camilleri (Courtesy OZ Records), Wilbur Wilde – saxophones on "Hotel Hell"
Tony Ansell – piano on "Why Dontcha All Get Fucked"; organ on "Meglomania"
Eddie "Spag" Leonetti – organ on "Twisted Innocence"; string machine on "Point in the Distance"

Charts

External links
 A 1978 ABCTV special of the making of 'Guilty Until Proven Insane'

References

1978 albums
Skyhooks (band) albums
Mushroom Records albums